Nashville is an unincorporated community in Brown Township, Hancock County, Indiana.

History
Nashville was laid out and platted in 1834.

Geography

References

Unincorporated communities in Hancock County, Indiana
Unincorporated communities in Indiana
Indianapolis metropolitan area